Svetlana Demidenko born Semova (born 16 February 1976) is a Russian female long-distance runner and mountain runner who won 2002 World Mountain Running Championships and two European Mountain Running Championships (2001, 2002).

References

External links
 
 Svetlana Demidenko at Association of Road Racing Statisticians

1976 births
Living people
Russian mountain runners
Russian female marathon runners
Russian female long-distance runners
World Mountain Running Championships winners